Joseph Edward Schermetzler (February 12, 1946 – March 26, 2002), known as Joe Schermie, was an American musician, best known as the bass player for the 1970s American rock-pop group Three Dog Night.

Biography

Schermie was born in Madison, Wisconsin.

He was the original bass player for Three Dog Night and played on most of the group's 21 hits.  Disillusioned with his role in the group, he left the band in 1973 and formed a group called S.S.Fools that included former members of Three Dog Night and Toto vocalist Bobby Kimball.  He later played some shows with former Three Dog Night vocalist Chuck Negron's band. He also worked with Stephen Stills, Yvonne Elliman and others.  Schermie appeared on the cooking show  Food Rules starring Tom Riehl in 2000 with original Three Dog Night drummer Floyd Sneed. This was his last television appearance.

Schermie died of a heart attack in 2002, at age 56.

References

External links

American rock bass guitarists
1946 births
2002 deaths
Musicians from Madison, Wisconsin
Three Dog Night members
20th-century American bass guitarists
American male bass guitarists
20th-century American male musicians